American Freight Furniture, Mattress, Appliance, or American Freight, is an American retail company that sells furniture, mattresses and home appliances. The company's history dates to 1968, when Sears established a surplus store in Kansas City, Missouri, which later became Sears Outlet; and 1994 when Steve Belford established American Freight Furniture & Mattress in Lima, Ohio.

History

Sears Surplus and Sears Outlet 
In 1968, Sears opened a Sears Surplus store in Kansas City. This was the first of its kind operated by the Sears brand. The purpose of the store was to liquidate returned items. Sears continued to open Surplus stores throughout the USA until 1993, and the network included many converted Kmart stores.

In 1994, the Surplus stores were renamed to Sears Outlet.

Apparel was introduced to in 2008 stores and served as a liquidation outlet for Lands' End.

In 2009, SearsOutlet.com was launched as an e-commerce platform allowing customers to purchase items online and in 2011, nationwide delivery was offered.

In 2012, parent Sears Holdings spun off Sears Outlet along with Sears (Authorized) Hometown Stores, Sears Home Appliance and Showroom Stores, and Sears Appliance and Hardware Stores to form Sears Hometown and Outlet Stores, Inc (SHOS). The new company became its own independent, publicly traded company listed on NASDAQ. At the time of the separation, there were 122 Sears Outlet Stores in operation.

The company partnered with the National Volunteer Fire Council in November 2013 to raise money for local fire departments. The objective of the campaign was to provide firehouses with funds to improve resources for training, equipment, and financial support.

When former parent Sears Holdings filed for Chapter 11 bankruptcy protection on October 15, 2018, Sears Hometown and Outlet Stores was not affected due to having been spun off from Sears since 2012.

In April 2019, it was announced that TransformCo would acquire the company. However it was reported a few days later that Sears Hometown and Outlet Stores acquisition offer was rejected, and as a result Sears Hometown and Outlet Stores could have faced liquidation, similarly to Sears Holdings but which was acquired by ESL Investments a few months earlier.

In June 2019, it was announced that TransformCo would acquire the remaining shares in the company. Under the terms of the new merger agreement, Sears Hometown was given a specified period of time to market and sell its Sears Outlet and Buddy's Home Furnishing Stores businesses (together, the "Outlet Segment") to a third party for not less than $97.5 million. If the Outlet Segment is sold in accordance with the terms, it would not be acquired by Transform in the acquisition of Sears Hometown. At the time of the announcement, Sears Hometown and Outlet Stores had 491 Hometown stores and 126 Outlet stores in 49 states, Puerto Rico and Bermuda.

In August 2019, Franchise Group, Inc., the parent of Liberty Tax, announced plans to acquire the Sears Outlet division from Sears Hometown and Outlet Stores, and on October 23, 2019, Sears Hometown and Outlet Stores completed its sale of Sears Outlet division to Franchise Group. TransformCo completed the acquisition of the remainder of Sears Hometown at the end of the same business day.

American Freight 

The first American Freight store was founded by Steve Belford in Lima, Ohio in 1994 as American Freight Furniture & Mattress, to provide working families with affordable furniture options. The store's strategy was to use modest warehouses to store the company’s furniture, and therefore eliminate markups associated with high-end showrooms.

The company was successful and by 2014 was operating 95 stores in 18 states, and October that year was acquired by an affiliate of private equity firm The Jordan Company of New York.

The company was acquired by Franchise Group for US$450M on February 14, 2020, and combined with the former Sears Outlets under the brand American Freight Furniture, Mattress, Appliance.

Awards 

 Customer Engagement award from the online publication Retail TouchPoints in 2014 for integration of in-store and online shopping experiences at Sears Outlet stores.

References

External links 

 

Sears Holdings brands
American brands
Retail companies of the United States
American companies established in 1968